Gürcütepe is a Neolithic site on the southeastern outskirts of Şanlıurfa in Turkey, consisting of four very shallow tells along Sirrin Stream that flows from Şanlıurfa. All four hills are now covered by modern buildings, so they are no longer recognizable. In the late 1990s a German archaeological team under the direction of Klaus Schmidt carried out soundings on all four hills and made extensive excavations on the second hill seen from the east.

Originally it was assumed that the four hills were settled in a specific time sequence, that one of these settlement phases would coincide with the nearby Göbekli Tepe. However, the excavations have indicated that all four hills were settled during the Pre-Pottery Neolithic B period; the easternmost hill is from the later Pre-Pottery Neolithic C period. 

Gürcütepe joins a group of Neolithic localities in Turkey, all rammed-earth buildings possessing space subdivisions next to larger community buildings. The small finds correspond to what archaeologists previously knew already. Overall, the Gürcütepe gives the impression of a rural settlement which was significantly younger than Göbekli Tepe.

References 
 M. Belle Bohn, Ch Gerber, M. Morsch, Klaus Schmidt:. Neolithische Forschungen in Obermesopotamien. Gürcütepe und Göbekli Tepe , In: Istanbul Releases 48, 1998, 5-78.
 Klaus Schmidt: Zuerst kam der Tempel, dann die Stadt. Bericht zu den Grabungen am Gürcütepe und am Göbekli Tepe 1996-1999 , In: Istanbul Releases 50, 2000, 5-40.
 Klaus Schmidt: Gürcütepe, in Die ältesten Monumente der Menschheit. Vor 12.000 Jahren in Anatolien [Great National Exhibition in 2007 in Baden Baden-Württemberg Landesmuseum Karlsruhe Palace, 20 January to 17 June 2007], ed. from the Badische Landesmuseum Karlsruhe. Theiss, Stuttgart 2007, p 94th
 Klaus Schmidt: Sie bauten die ersten Tempel. Das rätselhafte Heiligtum der Steinzeitjäger, die archäologische Entdeckung am Göbekli Tepe. Munich, 3rd, expanded and updated edition of 2007.

External links 
 Gürcütepe - Ancient Village or Settlement in Turkey

Archaeological sites of prehistoric Anatolia
Megalithic monuments in the Middle East
Tells (archaeology)
History of Şanlıurfa Province
Neolithic
Pre-Pottery Neolithic B
Archaeological sites in Southeastern Anatolia